Changes may refer to:

Books
 Changes, the 12th novel in Jim Butcher's The Dresden Files Series
 Changes, a novel by Danielle Steel
 Changes, a trilogy of novels on which the BBC TV series was based, written by Peter Dickinson

Film and television
 Changes (1991 film), a 1991 television film
 Changes (1969 film), a 1969 American drama film
 Changes (advertisement), a 1987 advertisement
 The Changes (TV series), produced by the BBC in 1975
 "Changes" (House), a 2011 episode of the American medical drama House
 "Changes", a 1984 episode of the American TV sitcom Silver Spoons
 "Changes", the name of five episodes of the TV sitcom Punky Brewster
 "Changes", the name of the You Can't Do That on Television 2004 reunion episode

Music
 A jazz term for chord progression
 An algorithmic Change ringing, pattern for ringing tuned bells
 Changes (Godsmack video album), a 2004 documentary and live DVD by the heavy metal band Godsmack

Bands
 Changes (band), an American folk band
 The Changes (band), an American rock band

Albums
 Changes (Alyson Avenue album), 2011
 Changes (Billy "Crash" Craddock album), 1980
 Changes (Catapilla album), 1972
 Changes (Charles Bradley album), 2016
 Changes (Christopher Williams album), 1992
 Changes (Crow Mother album), 2013
 Changes (A Cursive Memory album), 2008
 Changes (Etta James album), 1980
 Changes (For the Fallen Dreams album), 2008
 Changes (John Williams album), 1971
 Changes (Justin Bieber album), or the title song, 2020
 Changes (Keith Jarrett album), 1984
 Changes (Kelly Osbourne album), 2003
 Changes (Keni Burke album), 1982
 Changes (Kiley Dean album), 2010
 Changes (King Gizzard & the Lizard Wizard album), 2022
 Changes (Lisa Miskovsky album), 2006
 Changes (Modern Folk Quartet album), 1964
 Changes (The Monkees album), 1970
 Changes (Pandora album), 1996
 Changes (Roman Lob album), 2012
 Changes (Tanya Tucker album), 1983
 Changes (Vanilla Sky album), 2007
 Changes, an album by Alexander Kowalski, 2006
 Changes, an album by Johnny Rivers, 1966
 Changes, an album by Liu Fang and Michael O'Toole, 2008
 Changes, an album by Mike Lindup, 1990
 Changes, an album by R. Carlos Nakai, 1983
 Changes, an album by The Seldom Scene, 2019
 Changesbowie (David Bowie compilation album), 1990

Songs
 "Changes" (Black Sabbath song), 1972
 "Changes" (David Bowie song), 1971
 "Changes" (Faul & Wad Ad song), 2013
 "Changes" (Gareth Gates song), 2007
 "Changes" (Imagination song), 1982
 "Changes" (Tupac Shakur song), 1998
 "Changes" (Will Young song), 2008
 "Changes" (XXXTentacion song), 2018
 "Changes" (Yes song), 1983
 "Changes", a 1966 single by Crispian St. Peters
 "Changes", a song by "Buddy" Miles & Jimi Hendrix on the album Band of Gypsys
 "Changes", a song by Jane's Addiction
 "Changes", a song by Phil Ochs
 "Changes", a song by  the Spanish Artist Dareysteel 2003
 "Changes", a song by Godsmack on the album Faceless
 "Changes", a song by The Zombies on the album Odessey and Oracle
 "Changes", a song by 3 Doors Down on the album Away from the Sun
 "Changes", a song by Sugar on the album Copper Blue
 "Changes", a song by Chris Lake
 "Changes", a song by Moby Grape on their album Moby Grape
 "Changes", a song by Santana on their album Zebop!
"Changes", a song by Mala of Digital Mystikz
 "Changes", a single by Dirty Vegas from their third studio album Electric Love
 "Changes", a single by Alan Price featured in the 1973 British comedy-drama O Lucky Man!
 "Changes", a promotional single by Brooke Candy
"Changes", or "I Want Changes", or "Khochu peremen", a song by Viktor Tsoi associated with protest in Belarus and Russia

See also 
 Change (disambiguation)